The 1985 Arab Cup was the fourth edition of the Arab Cup hosted by Ta'if, Saudi Arabia. The competition come back after nineteen years of absence. The defending champion Iraq won the title for the 3rd time.

Qualified teams 

The 6 qualified teams are:

Venues

Squads

Group stage

Group A

Group B

Knock-out stage 
{{Round4-with third

|10 July 1985 – Taif||3||2
|10 July 1985 – Taif| |1 (3)||1 (1)

|12 July 1985 – Taif||1||0

|12 July 1985 – Taif|

Semi-finals

Third place play-off

Final

Goalscorers 
5 goals
  Anad Abid

References

External links 
Details in RSSSF

 

 
1985
1985 in African football
1985 in Asian football
1984–85 in Saudi Arabian football
1984–85 in Iraqi football
1984–85 in Qatari football
1984–85 in Bahraini football
1985 in Jordanian sport
July 1985 sports events in Asia